Good Grief is an unincorporated community in Boundary County, Idaho.  It was "saluted" in the early 1970s on the television show Hee Haw as having "a population of three with two dogs and one old grouch".

References

Unincorporated communities in Boundary County, Idaho
Unincorporated communities in Idaho